János Végső (born 1 December 1990) is a Hungarian darts player who plays in Professional Darts Corporation events.

In 2016, he made his PDC European Tour debut at the 2016 European Darts Trophy and the 2016 German Darts Championship, losing in the first round to Martin Schindler and Darren Johnson respectively.

In 2017, he made his television debut in the 2017 PDC World Cup of Darts, partnering Zoltán Mester, but they lost in the first round to John Part and John Norman Jnr of Canada. In 2019, he returned to the World Cup with his new partner Pál Székely, but they again lost in the first round, this time to Max Hopp and Martin Schindler of Germany.

References

External links

1990 births
Living people
Hungarian darts players
Professional Darts Corporation associate players
PDC World Cup of Darts Hungarian team